Tolimán is a town and municipality, in Jalisco in central-western Mexico. The municipality covers an area of  460 km².

As of 2005, the municipality had a total population of 8,756.

References

Municipalities of Jalisco